Regillio Simons (born 28 June 1973) is a Dutch former professional footballer who played as a striker. He is the father of Xavi Simons.

Career
Simons started playing football at FC Amstelland. He played for SC Telstar, Fortuna Sittard, NAC, Willem II, Kyoto Purple Sanga (Japan), ADO Den Haag and TOP Oss. In his best time he was employed by Fortuna Sittard. In the 1998–99 season he had a big contribution with two goals in the 1–3 victory over Ajax in Amsterdam Arena. In that same year he scored four times in the 6–4 home win against PSV Eindhoven. After his professional career he defended several years the colors of FC Türkiyemspor, an Amsterdam amateur club playing in the top Sunday league. From summer 2008 he played for the AFC Ajax (amateurs) for two years.

Since 2005 he also started his coaching career and became a head coach at various clubs. This season he is a head coach of one of the Ajax Youth Academy teams. Since 2010 Simons is in the possession of the Coaching degree UEFA Pro Licence.

Personal life
Born in the Netherlands, Simons is of Surinamese descent. Regillio Simons now lives in Spain, while one of his two sons, Xavi Simons, is a player for Dutch club PSV Eindhoven.

References

External links
 
 
 kyotosangadc

1973 births
Living people
Association football forwards
Dutch footballers
Dutch sportspeople of Surinamese descent
Dutch emigrants to Spain
Footballers from Amsterdam
Eredivisie players
J1 League players
Kyoto Sanga FC players
ADO Den Haag players
Fortuna Sittard players
NAC Breda players
Willem II (football club) players
TOP Oss players
FC Türkiyemspor players
Dutch expatriate footballers
Expatriate footballers in Japan
Dutch football managers
JOS Watergraafsmeer managers